Udumalaipettai taluk is a taluk of Tirupur district of the Indian state of Tamil Nadu. The headquarters is the town of Udumalpet..

Demographics
According to the 2011 census, the taluk of Udumalaipettai had a population of 237,633 with 1,18,014  males and 1,19,619 females. There were 1014 women for every 1000 men. The taluk had a literacy rate of 73.45. Child population in the age group below 6 was 8,954 Males and 8,377 Females.

See also
Anikkadavu

References 

Taluks of Tiruppur district